The 1961 PGA Championship was the 43rd PGA Championship, played July 27–31 at the North Course of Olympia Fields Country Club in Olympia Fields, Illinois, a suburb south of Chicago. Jerry Barber, age 45, won his only major title in an 18-hole Monday playoff by one stroke over Don January, 67 to 68. It was the fourth edition as a stroke play event and the first playoff.

Rain washed out the second round on Friday afternoon with only about one-third of the field completing their rounds. The scores were scrapped and the second round was replayed on Saturday, with 36 holes on Sunday. Barber led at the midway point with a 136 (−4), two shots ahead of January and Doug Sanders. A top putter of the era, Barber sank  of putts on the last three holes of the final round to erase a four-stroke deficit to January and force a Monday playoff. At the 72nd hole, January had a two-stroke lead, but put his tee shot into the sand. Barber drained his third lengthy putt in as many holes (birdie-par-birdie) to even it up at the end of regulation.

In the playoff, the two were tied at three-under after 16 holes, following January's birdie. Both had pars at the 17th, which effectively turned the 18th hole into sudden-death. Both tee shots found fairway bunkers, and Barber hit a 3-iron onto the green,  from the cup.

At age 45, Barber became the oldest winner of the PGA Championship, whose previous champions were all under age 40, with several at age 39. At the time, the only older major winner was Old Tom Morris at age 46 in 1867. Barber was surpassed in 1968 by Julius Boros at age 48.

It was the third major championship at Olympia Fields Country Club; it previously hosted the PGA Championship in 1925 (Courses 3 & 4) and the U.S. Open in 1928 (Course 4). The four 18-hole courses at Olympia Fields were reduced to two in the 1940s when the club sold half of its property. Course 4 became the North course, and the South course is a composite of holes form the other three. The North Course later hosted the U.S. Open in 2003, won by Jim Furyk.

Past champions in the field

Made the cut

Missed the cut 

Source:

Round summaries

First round
Thursday, July 27, 1961

Source:

Second round
Friday, July 28, 1961
Saturday, July 29, 1961

Play in the second round on Friday was ended by heavy rain in the early afternoon, with 54 of the 166 rounds completed. All scores were scrapped and the round was replayed on Saturday.

Source:

Third round
Sunday, July 30, 1961 (morning)

Final round
Sunday, July 30, 1961 (afternoon)

Playoff
Monday, July 31, 1961

Scorecard

Source:

References

External links
PGA Media Guide 2012
GolfCompendium.com – 1961 PGA Championship
PGA.com – 1961 PGA Championship

PGA Championship
Golf in Illinois
PGA Championship
PGA Championship
PGA Championship
PGA Championship